This article contains information about the literary events and publications of 1968.

Events
January 1 – Cecil Day-Lewis is announced as the new Poet Laureate of the United Kingdom.
March 28 – Glidrose Publications releases the James Bond novel, Colonel Sun by "Robert Markham" (a pseudonym for Kingsley Amis). Initially intended to relaunch the Bond book series after the death in 1964 of the character's creator, Ian Fleming, Colonel Sun ends up as the final book in the series, discounting a "biography" of Bond and a pair of film-script adaptations, until John Gardner revives it in 1981.
April – The American edition of Andrew Garve's thriller The Long Short Cut becomes the first book printed completely by electronic composition.
May – The Action Theater in Munich is disbanded after its building is wrecked by one of its founders, jealous of director Rainer Werner Fassbinder's growing power in the group.
June 17 – Tom Stoppard's parodic comedy The Real Inspector Hound opens at the Criterion Theatre in London's West End, starring Richard Briers and Ronnie Barker.
July 28 – Last Exit to Brooklyn is cleared of obscenity in the English appeal court. John Mortimer appears for the defence. This is the last prosecution of a book under the U.K. Obscene Publications Acts.
August – Tom Wolfe's books The Electric Kool-Aid Acid Test and The Pump House Gang are published on the same day. Both will become bestsellers and cement Wolfe's status as a leading social critic, chronicler of the counterculture of the 1960s, and practitioner of New Journalism.
September 26 – Theatres Act 1968 (royal assent July 26) ends censorship of the theater in the United Kingdom.
October – Colin Spencer's comedy Spitting Image, one of the first plays with openly gay male leads, premières in London
October 31 – Alan Bennett's first stage play, Forty Years On, opens at the Apollo Theatre in London's West End under the direction of Patrick Garland, starring Sir John Gielgud, Paul Eddington and the playwright.
November – The English novelist Anthony Burgess and his new wife Liana settle in Lija on Malta.
unknown dates
The first translations and book-length discussion of the Sumerian Enheduanna's work is published. She is a priestess and poet of the 23rd century BC and the earliest named author known.
Dean R. Koontz's first novel, Star Quest, is published by Ace Books in the United States.
N. Scott Momaday's novel House Made of Dawn is published, winning the Pulitzer Prize for Fiction in 1969 and initiating the Native American Renaissance.
The Arvon Foundation is established by young poets John Fairfax and John Moat in the UK to promote creative writing.

New books

Fiction
Lloyd Alexander – The High King
Isaac Asimov – Asimov's Mysteries
James Barlow – The Burden of Proof
James Blish – Black Easter
Nelson Bond – Nightmares and Daydreams
Elizabeth Bowen – Eva Trout
Richard Brautigan – In Watermelon Sugar
Rolf Dieter Brinkmann – Keiner weiß mehr (Nobody knows anymore)
John Brunner
Not Before Time
Stand on Zanzibar
Anthony Burgess – Enderby Outside
Martin Caidin – The God Machine
Taylor Caldwell – Testimony of Two Men
Philip Callow – Going to the Moon (first in Another Flesh trilogy)
Victor Canning – The Melting Man
John Christopher – The Pool of Fire
John Dickson Carr
Dark of the Moon
Papa La-Bas
Agatha Christie – By the Pricking of My Thumbs
Arthur C. Clarke – 2001: A Space Odyssey
L. Sprague de Camp
The Goblin Tower
The Tritonian Ring
With Lin Carter – Conan of the Isles
 Cecil Day-Lewis – The Private Wound
August Derleth
The Adventure of the Unique Dickensians
Mr. Fairlie's Final Journey
A Praed Street Dossier
Wisconsin Murders
Philip K. Dick – Do Androids Dream of Electric Sheep?
Allen Drury – Preserve and Protect
Lawrence Durrell – Tunc
Haddis Alemayehu – Love to the Grave (Amharic: ፍቅር እስከ መቃብር, Fəqər əskä Mäqabər)
 Richard Gordon – Surgeon at Arms
Arthur Hailey – Airport
Michael Harrison – The Exploits of Chevalier Dupin
L. P. Hartley – Poor Clare
Georgette Heyer – Cousin Kate
Barry Hines – A Kestrel for a Knave
Robert E. Howard and L. Sprague de Camp
Conan the Freebooter
With Lin Carter – Conan the Wanderer
With Björn Nyberg – Conan the Avenger
Michael Innes – Appleby at Allington
John Irving – Setting Free the Bears
Dorothy M. Johnson – Indian Country
James Jones – The Ice-Cream Headache and Other Stories
Halldór Laxness – Kristnihald undir jökli (Christianity under the Glacier)
John le Carré – A Small Town in Germany
John D. MacDonald
Pale Gray for Guilt
The Girl in the Plain Brown Wrapper
Helen MacInnes – The Salzburg Connection
Norman Mailer – Armies of the Night
Robert Markham – Colonel Sun
Ngaio Marsh – Clutch of Constables
Patrick Modiano – La Place de l'Étoile
N. Scott Momaday – House Made of Dawn
Brian Moore – I Am Mary Dunne
Alice Munro – Dance of the Happy Shades (short stories)
Andrew Osmond and Douglas Hurd – Send Him Victorious
Anthony Powell – The Military Philosophers
Jean Rhys – Tigers Are Better-Looking
Mordecai Richler – Cocksure
Keith Roberts – Pavane
Giorgio Scerbanenco – I ragazzi del massacro
Rudi Šeligo – Triptih Agate Schwarzkobler
Robert Silverberg – The Masks of Time
Aleksandr Solzhenitsyn
Cancer Ward («Раковый Корпус», Rakovy Korpus)
In the First Circle («В круге первом», V kruge pervom)
Muriel Spark – The Public Image
Angus John Mackintosh Stewart – Sandel
Sri Lal Sukla – Raag Darbari
Rosemary Tonks – The Bloater
John Updike – Couples
Jack Vance – City of the Chasch
Tarjei Vesaas – The Boat in the Evening
Gore Vidal – Myra Breckinridge
Christa Wolf – The Quest for Christa T. (Nachdenken über Christa T.)
John Wyndham – Chocky

Children and young people
Lloyd Alexander – The High King
Joan Aiken – The Whispering Mountain
Rev. W. Awdry – Enterprising Engines (twenty-third in The Railway Series of 42 books by him and his son Christopher Awdry)
Elisabeth Beresford – The Wombles (first in the Wombles series of six titles)
Don Freeman – Corduroy
Clement Freud (with Frank Francis) – Grimble
John Grant – Littlenose (first in the Littlenose series of 15 books)
Rosemary Harris – The Moon in the Cloud
Russell Hoban – The Mouse and His Child
Ted Hughes – The Iron Man
Judith Kerr – The Tiger Who Came to Tea
Alexander Key – Escape to Witch Mountain
Ursula Le Guin – A Wizard of Earthsea (first in the Earthsea series)
Ruth Manning-Sanders – A Book of Mermaids
David McKee – Elmer the Patchwork Elephant
Robert C. O'Brien – The Silver Crown
Seymour Simon – The Look-it-up Book of the Earth (non-fiction)
Jill Tomlinson – The Owl Who Was Afraid of the Dark
Paul Zindel – The Pigman (first in The Pigman trilogy)

Drama
Alan Bennett – Forty Years On
Hugo Claus – Vrijdag (Friday)
Mart Crowley – The Boys in the Band
Thomas Kilroy – The Death and Resurrection of Mr Roche
Arthur Kopit – Indians
Colin Spencer – Spitting Image
Tom Stoppard – The Real Inspector Hound
Shūji Terayama (寺山 修司) – Throw Away Your Books, Rally in the Streets (書を捨てよ町へ出よう, Sho o Suteyo, Machi e Deyō)
Michel Tremblay – Les Belles-Sœurs

Poetry

Rod McKuen – Lonesome Cities
George Oppen – Of Being Numerous

Non-fiction
Peter Brook – The Empty Space
L. Sprague de Camp
The Conan Reader
The Great Monkey Trial
With Catherine Crook de Camp – The Day of the Dinosaur
Carlos Castaneda – The Teachings of Don Juan: A Yaqui Way of Knowledge
Eldridge Cleaver – Soul on Ice
Paul R. Ehrlich – The Population Bomb
Esther Hautzig – The Endless Steppe (autobiography)
Bevis Hillier – Art Deco of the 20s and 30s
H. P. Lovecraft – Selected Letters II (1925–1929)
Peter Maas – The Valachi Papers
Norman Mailer – Miami and the Siege of Chicago
William Manchester – The Arms of Krupp: 1597-1968
James Morris – Pax Britannica: The Climax of Empire
Charles Rembar – The End of Obscenity: The Trials of Lady Chatterley, Tropic of Cancer and Fanny Hill
Adam Smith – The Money Game
Erich von Däniken – Chariots of the Gods? (Erinnerungen an die Zukunft)
James D. Watson – The Double Helix

Births
January 30 – Rhoda Shipman, American comic book writer
February 11 - Mo Willems, American children's author and cartoonist
February 27 - Lisa McMann, American young-adult novelist
March 23 – Mitch Cullin, American novelist
March 31 – Yann Moix, French novelist and filmmaker
May 27 – Ekow Eshun, British Ghanaian writer, journalist and broadcaster
June 11
Bryan Perro, Canadian author
Emma Clayton, American children's novelist and dystopian thriller author
June 12 – Peadar Ó Guilín, Irish novelist
July 6 – Tiit Aleksejev, Estonian novelist and playwright
July 7 – Jeff VanderMeer, American fiction writer
September 14 – Shuichi Yoshida (吉田修), Japanese novelist
October 28 – Uwe Tellkamp, German writer
December 6 – Karl Ove Knausgård, Norwegian autobiographical novelist
December 14 - Rachel Cohn, American young-adult writer
December 31 – Junot Díaz, Dominican American novelist
unknown date – K. V. Johansen, Canadian children's author

Deaths
January 1 – Donagh MacDonagh, Irish poet, playwright and judge (born 1912)
January 14 – Dorothea Mackellar, Australian poet (born 1885)
January 21 – Will Lang, Jr., American journalist (born 1914)
February 23 – Fannie Hurst, American novelist (born 1889)
March 22 - Margaret Duley, Newfoundland novelist (born 1894)
March 23 – Edwin O'Connor, American journalist, novelist, and radio commentator (born 1918)
April 4 - Muhammad Taha al-Huwayzi, Iranian-Iraqi Ja'fari jurist, religious teacher and poet (born 1889) 
April 9 - Zofia Kossak, Polish writer (born 1889)
April 16 – Edna Ferber, American novelist, short story writer and playwright (born 1885)
April 25 – Donald Davidson, American poet (born 1893)
April 27 – Vasily Azhayev, Soviet writer (born 1915)
April 29 – Anthony Boucher, American author, critic, and editor (born 1911)
May 1 – Sir Harold Nicolson, British biographer (born 1886)
May 30
Constantin S. Nicolăescu-Plopșor, Romanian anthropologist, ethnographer and children's writer (born 1900)
Martin Noth, German Hebraist (born 1902)
May 31 – Abel Bonnard, French poet, novelist and politician (born 1883)
June 1 – Helen Keller, deaf-blind American author, activist and lecturer (born 1880)
June 2 – A. A. Thomson, English cricket and travel writer (born 1894)
August 21 - Germaine Guèvremont, Canadian writer (born 1893)
September 29 – Sixto Pondal Ríos, Argentine screenwriter, poet and dramatist (born 1907)
October 30 – Conrad Richter, American novelist (born 1890)
November 17 – Mervyn Peake, English novelist (dementia, born 1911)
November 25 – Upton Sinclair, American novelist and politician (born 1878)
November 28 – Enid Blyton, English author and poet (born 1897)
December 5 – Anna Kavan, British novelist, short story writer and painter (born 1901)
December 10 – Tian Han, Chinese dramatist (born 1898)
December 20 – John Steinbeck, American novelist (congestive heart failure, born 1902)
December 24 – D. Gwenallt Jones, Welsh poet (born 1899)

Awards
Nobel Prize for Literature: Yasunari Kawabata

Canada
See 1968 Governor General's Awards for a complete list of winners and finalists for those awards.

France
Prix Goncourt: Bernard Clavel, Les Fruits de l'hiver
Prix Médicis: Élie Wiesel, Le Mendiant de Jérusalem

United Kingdom
Carnegie Medal for children's literature: Rosemary Harris, The Moon in the Cloud
Cholmondeley Award: Harold Massingham, Edwin Morgan
Eric Gregory Award: James Aitchison, Douglas Dunn, Brian Jones
James Tait Black Memorial Prize for fiction: Maggie Ross, The Gasteropod
James Tait Black Memorial Prize for biography: Gordon Haight, George Eliot
Newdigate prize: James Fenton
Queen's Gold Medal for Poetry: Robert Graves

United States
American Academy of Arts and Letters Gold Medal in Poetry, W. H. Auden
Hugo Award: Roger Zelazny, Lord of Light
Nebula Award: Alexei Panshin, Rite of Passage
Newbery Medal for children's literature: E. L. Konigsburg, From the Mixed-Up Files of Mrs. Basil E. Frankweiler
Pulitzer Prize for Drama: no award given
Pulitzer Prize for Fiction: William Styron, The Confessions of Nat Turner
Pulitzer Prize for Poetry: Anthony Hecht, The Hard Hours
Pulitzer Prize for Poetry: Anthony Hecht, Mijn moeder

Elsewhere
Miles Franklin Award: Thomas Keneally, Three Cheers for the Paraclete
Alfaguara Prize: Daniel Sueiro, Corte de corteza
Premio Nadal: Álvaro Cunqueiro, El hombre que se parecía a Orestes
Viareggio Prize: Libero Bigiaretti, La controfigura

Notes

References

 
Years of the 20th century in literature